Milovan Sikimić (Serbian Cyrillic: Милован Сикимић; born 25 October 1980) is a Serbian former professional footballer who played as a defender.

With two different clubs (Guingamp and Strasbourg), Sikimić played in the first five levels of the French football league system (Ligue 1, Ligue 2, National, CFA and CFA 2).

He is the older brother of Predrag Sikimić.

Career
After playing with Mladenovac in his country, Sikimić moved abroad to France and signed a three-year contract with Guingamp in June 2002. He immediately became an important part of the team, making over 150 competitive appearances for the club in the following five years.

In July 2007, Sikimić returned to his homeland and signed with Partizan. He was initially a regular member of the team's defensive line. However, due to often injuries, Sikimić made only 12 official appearances for the club in the following two seasons, as Partizan won two doubles.

In July 2009, Sikimić moved back to France and signed with Strasbourg. He was transferred to Cypriot club Apollon Limassol in July 2011. However, after only few months, Sikimić returned to Strasbourg. He also spent one season at Mulhouse, before leaving the club in the summer of 2016.

Statistics

Honours
Partizan
 Serbian SuperLiga: 2007–08, 2008–09
 Serbian Cup: 2007–08, 2008–09
Strasbourg
 CFA: 2012–13 (Group B)
 CFA 2: 2011–12 (Group C)

References

External links
 
 
 Milovan Sikimić at racingstub.com

Apollon Limassol FC players
Association football defenders
Championnat National 2 players
Championnat National players
Cypriot First Division players
En Avant Guingamp players
Expatriate footballers in Cyprus
Expatriate footballers in France
FC Mulhouse players
FK Partizan players
Ligue 1 players
Ligue 2 players
OFK Mladenovac players
RC Strasbourg Alsace players
Serbian expatriate footballers
Serbian expatriate sportspeople in Cyprus
Serbian expatriate sportspeople in France
Serbian footballers
Serbian SuperLiga players
Sportspeople from Smederevo
1980 births
Living people